Calisoga is a genus of spiders in the family Nemesiidae, first described in 1937 by Ralph Vary Chamberlin. , it contains five species, all in the USA.

References

Nemesiidae
Mygalomorphae genera
Spiders of the United States